3C 303 is a Seyfert galaxy with a quasar-like appearance located in the constellation Boötes.

References

External links
 www.jb.man.ac.uk/atlas/ (J. P. Leahy)

Radio galaxies
Seyfert galaxies
303
3C 303
Boötes